Billy Joe Walker Jr. (February 29, 1952 – July 25, 2017) was an American songwriter, record producer and recording artist. He composed singles for Eddie Rabbitt, including "I Wanna Dance with You", "That's Why I Fell in Love with You" and "B-B-B-Burnin' Up with Love". He produced the first three albums of Bryan White, and for Pam Tillis, Collin Raye and Travis Tritt. He was also a session musician who played guitar. Between 1987 and 1994, he recorded seven solo albums, all for major labels.

Walker died following a period of declining health on July 25, 2017.

Discography

Collaborations 
 Three Way Mirror - Livingston Taylor (1978)
 TNT - Tanya Tucker (1978)
 Never Alone - Amy Grant (1980)
 Share Your Love - Kenny Rogers (1981)
 Juice - Juice Newton (1981)
 It's the World Gone Crazy - Glen Campbell (1981)
 Love Will Turn You Around - Kenny Rogers (1982)
 Changes - Tanya Tucker (1982)
 We've Got Tonight - Kenny Rogers (1983)
 What About Me? - Kenny Rogers (1984)
 Riddles in the Sand - Jimmy Buffett (1984)
 Once Upon a Christmas - Kenny Rogers, Dolly Parton (1984)
 Rhythm & Romance - Rosanne Cash (1985)
 The Heart of the Matter - Kenny Rogers (1985)
 Real Love - Dolly Parton (1985)
 The Things That Matter - Vince Gill (1985)
 They Don't Make Them Like They Used To - Kenny Rogers (1986)
 King's Record Shop - Rosanne Cash (1987)
 Still Within the Sound of My Voice - Glen Campbell (1987)
 Little Love Affairs - Nanci Griffith (1988)
 Light Years - Glen Campbell (1988)
 Walkin' in the Sun - Glen Campbell (1990)
 All I Can Be - Collin Raye (1991)
 Pocket Full of Gold - Vince Gill (1991)
 In This Life - Collin Raye (1992)
 Can't Run from Yourself - Tanya Tucker (1992)
 Shania Twain - Shania Twain (1993)
 Soon - Tanya Tucker (1993)
 Extremes - Collin Raye (1994)
 When Love Finds You - Vince Gill (1994)
 Healing Hands of Time - Willie Nelson (1994)
 Storm in the Heartland - Billy Ray Cyrus (1994)
 Wild Angels - Martina McBride (1995)
 Fire to Fire - Tanya Tucker (1995)
 I Think About You - Collin Raye (1995)
 Jewel of the South - Rodney Crowell (1995)
 It Matters to Me - Faith Hill (1995)
 High Lonesome Sound - Vince Gill (1996)
 Christmas: The Gift - Collin Raye (1996)
 Evolution - Martina McBride (1997)
 Complicated - Tanya Tucker (1997)
 The Walls Came Down - Collin Raye (1998)
 The Other Side - Billy Ray Cyrus (2003)
 These Days - Vince Gill (2006)

References

External links

1952 births
2017 deaths
American country guitarists
American male guitarists
American country singer-songwriters
American country record producers
Musicians from Nashville, Tennessee
New-age guitarists
MCA Records artists
DGC Records artists
Liberty Records artists
Singer-songwriters from Texas
Guitarists from Tennessee
Guitarists from Texas
20th-century American guitarists
Country musicians from Texas
Country musicians from Tennessee
20th-century American male musicians
American male singer-songwriters
Singer-songwriters from Tennessee